Huaizhou or Huai Prefecture was a zhou (prefecture) in imperial China centering on modern Qinyang, Jiaozuo, Henan, China. It existed (intermittently) from 467 to 1257.

Geography
The administrative region of Huaizhou in the Tang dynasty falls within modern Henan. It probably includes parts of modern: 
 Under the administration of Jiaozuo, Henan:
 Jiaozuo: Jiefang District, Shanyang District, Zhongzhan District, Macun District
 Qinyang
 Xiuwu County
 Wuzhi County
 Bo'ai County
 Under the administration of Xinxiang, Henan:
 Huojia County

Between 619 and 621 during the Tang dynasty, the headquarter was temporarily moved west to Jiyuan, Henan.

References
 

Prefectures of the Sui dynasty
Prefectures of the Tang dynasty
Prefectures of the Song dynasty
Prefectures of the Jin dynasty (1115–1234)
Former prefectures in Henan